The 2017 Coke Zero 400 powered by Coca-Cola was a Monster Energy NASCAR Cup Series race held on July 1, 2017 at Daytona International Speedway in Daytona Beach, Florida. Contested over 163 laps extended from 160 laps due to overtime, on the  superspeedway, it was the 17th race of the 2017 Monster Energy NASCAR Cup Series season.

Report

Background

The race will be held at Daytona International Speedway, a race track located in Daytona Beach, Florida, United States. Since opening in 1959, the track is the home of the Daytona 500, the most prestigious race in NASCAR. In addition to NASCAR, the track also hosts races of ARCA, AMA Superbike, USCC, SCCA, and Motocross. The track's  infield includes the  Lake Lloyd, which has hosted powerboat racing. The speedway is owned and operated by International Speedway Corporation.

The track was built in 1959 by NASCAR founder William "Bill" France, Sr. to host racing held at the former Daytona Beach Road Course. His banked design permitted higher speeds and gave fans a better view of the cars. Lights were installed around the track in 1998 and today, it is the third-largest single lit outdoor sports facility. The speedway has been renovated three times, with the infield renovated in 2004 and the track repaved twice — in 1978 and in 2010.

On January 22, 2013, the track unveiled artist depictions of a renovated speedway. On July 5 of that year, ground was broken for a project that would remove the backstretch seating and completely redevelop the frontstretch seating. The renovation to the speedway is being worked on by Rossetti Architects. The project, named "Daytona Rising", was completed in January 2016, and it costed US $400 million, placing emphasis on improving fan experience with five expanded and redesigned fan entrances (called "injectors") as well as wider and more comfortable seating with more restrooms and concession stands. After the renovations, the track's grandstands include 101,000 permanent seats with the ability to increase permanent seating to 125,000. The project was completed before the start of Speedweeks 2016.

Entry list

Practice

First practice

Final practice

Qualifying

Qualifying results

Race

First stage
Dale Earnhardt Jr. led the field to the green flag at 7:58 p.m., but teammate Chase Elliott passed him in Turn 3 and led the first lap. After leading the first four, Elliott dropped to the bottom and allowed Brad Keselowski to pass him on the high-side going into Turn 1 to take the lead on the fifth lap. Ryan Sieg and Cole Whitt suffered engine failures on lap 10, bringing out the first caution of the race.

The race restarted on lap 13. Denny Hamlin made an unscheduled stop a lap later for a loose wheel, which was a result of having only one lug nut. Fortuitous for him, caution #2 flew two laps later when D. J. Kennington spun out moments after blowing his engine in Turn 4.

Back to green on lap 20, Kevin Harvick – heading up the bottom line of cars – caught up to and edged out Keselowski at the start/finish line to take the lead on lap 30. The next lap, Earnhardt charged up the extreme outside and inched out both Keselowski and Harvick to lead his first lap of the night. Keselowski reestablished his lead on lap 33, but Earnhardt and Harvick bypassed him on lap 34, with Harvick leading it. Keselowski regained the point on lap 35 and Earnhardt took over on lap 37. Finally, Keselowski gained the upper hand on lap 38 and won the first stage on lap 40, with caution #3 flying moments later for the conclusion of the stage. Erik Jones took over the lead when the others pitted, as he opted not to pit.

Second stage
A lap after resuming action on lap 47, Hamlin took over the lead. Exiting Turn 4 on lap 49, Michael McDowell and Daniel Suárez made contact and both wound up on the apron. But rather than blend back into the field and risk causing a wreck, both dove full speed down pit road – which NASCAR allows drivers to do to avoid a wreck/avoid causing a wreck – and rejoined the field at the tail-end. Earnhardt cut down a tire and hit the wall in Turn 1 on lap 51, a result of contact with Paul Menard. Caution flew for the fourth time when Jeffrey Earnhardt blew an engine on lap 59.

The race returned to green on lap 64. Matt Kenseth took the lead from teammate Hamlin on lap 69. Rounding Turn 2 on lap 71, Kyle Busch suffered a left-rear tire failure and spun out in front of most of the field, resulting in a 10-car wreck, which brought out the fifth caution. Austin Dillon, Joey Logano and Martin Truex Jr. took the heaviest damage in the melee. The failure was a result of Busch making contact the lap prior with McDowell heading into Turn 1. Logano's comments after he was released from the care center verified supported this, saying he saw McDowell get "into the side of (Busch). I didn’t see any smoke off (Busch’s car), just a near miss. Then four or five laps later I think, the left-rear popped on and around (Busch) started going and we were there."

Racing resumed on lap 76 and Kenseth drove on to win the second stage. Caution #6 flew moments later for the end of the stage. Harvick elected not to pit and usurped the lead under the caution.

Final stage

On the lap 86 restart, Ricky Stenhouse Jr. passed Harvick heading down the backstretch to take the lead. Brendan Gaughan made contact with the wall in Turn 2 on lap 90, bringing out the seventh caution. Suárez took the lead when Stenhouse pitted.

Back to green on lap 96, Elliott and McDowell made contact exiting Turn 2 on lap 98, which sent Elliott spinning down the backstretch, collecting Trevor Bayne in the process. This brought out the eighth caution.

On the ensuing lap 102 restart, Kenseth took back the lead from teammate Suárez, only to lose it two laps later to Jimmie Johnson. Caution #9 flew a lap later when Harvick suffered a rear tire blowout and spun out in Turn 2, collecting Earnhardt and three others. Earnhardt said afterwards that he wished he "had had a good finish tonight if not a win. We were working up in there and having a good time and being aggressive and wearing out the sides of that race car. It just wasn't to be." Clint Bowyer took the lead when Johnson pitted.

Restart flew on lap 111. The next lap around, Stenhouse was back in front. Caution flew for the 10th time on lap 117 when Keselowski spun out in Turn 4. Stenhouse and Bowyer pitted, handing the lead back to Kenseth.

When the field reached the backstretch on the lap 121, Kasey Kahne was turned by David Ragan and spun down onto the apron, bringing out the 11th caution.

The race restarted on lap 125. Ryan Blaney made a crossover move on Kenseth on the backstretch to take the lead with 33 laps to go. Caution flew for the 12th time a lap later when Matt DiBenedetto when he suffered a right-front tire failure and slammed the wall.

The race resumed with 28 to go. Stenhouse worked his way back to the front with 25 to go, with Kahne taking over the following lap. From 22 to 20 to go, he and Suárez battled side-by-side for the lead, with Kahne taking sole control with 19 to go. With 11 to go, Stenhouse side-drafted him down the backstretch to retake the lead. Ty Dillon was credited as the leader with nine to go. Coming to the line with eight to go, Kyle Larson got turned into the tri-oval wall, lifting his car into the air for a few seconds. After his car landed back on the ground, it was t-boned by Blaney and made contact with Kenseth. This triggered a multi-car wreck that brought out the 13th caution, as well as an eight-minute and 41-second red flag.

Dillon lacked draft help on the ensuing restart with three to go, while Ragan got an excellent push to take the race lead. But a 2-car spin on the backstretch involving Jones and Hamlin sent the race into overtime and brought out the 14th caution.

Overtime
Heading down the backstretch in overtime with two to go, Ragan jumped to the high line and left the bottom open. Stenhouse pounced on the opening, took the lead going into Turn 3 and drove on to score the victory.

Post-race
Stenhouse said in victory lane that his win validated "what we did at Talladega. We have been working hard at Roush Fenway and this pushes us further along. This Ford Performance team has been amazing. Ford has been dominant.”

Bowyer, who finished runner-up, said being bridesmaid "sucks. I want to win. We’re in this business to win. That's what Tony (Stewart) and Gene (Haas) pay me to do." He also added that Stenhouse had "the fastest car right then. He did a good job getting it to the front, and she set sail. He does a good job of blocking. He's learned a lot. He's become a good [restrictor-]plate racer. I remember when he came in, he was a little bit chaotic, but he's not now. He's got it figured out, and he's won two of them."

McDowell, who finished a career-best fourth, on top of his six top-20 finishes in eight races, said it's awesome "to do this week after week. We’ve been putting together solid runs. At the same time, coming to the line second, I thought I had a shot at (Stenhouse) but just they had such a big run behind I couldn't hold them off.”

Ragan, who finished sixth after leading on the final restart, said he "made one bad move," and a few other "bad moves tonight," but that he was in a damned if he did and damned if he didn't scenario. "So if it was Thursday and you said ‘We’ll give a sixth-place finish,’ I probably would have taken that coming down to Daytona because my record hasn’t been that great the last several years here," he added. "I’ve been caught up in wrecks and haven’t been able to finish one of these things clean, but to be that close is bittersweet. It hurts, but I got a lot of racing left and I’m a tough guy. I can handle it.”

Race results

Stage results

Stage 1
Laps: 40

Stage 2
Laps: 40

Final stage results

Stage 3
Laps: 83

Race statistics
 Lead changes: 16 among different drivers
 Cautions/Laps: 14 for 51
 Red flags: 1 for 8 minutes and 41 seconds
 Time of race: 3 hours, 17 minutes and 12 seconds
 Average speed:

Media

Television
NBC Sports will cover the race on the television side. Rick Allen, Jeff Burton and Steve Letarte will call in the booth for the race. Dave Burns, Parker Kligerman, Marty Snider and Kelli Stavast report from pit lane during the race.

Radio
MRN will have the radio call for the race which was also be simulcasted on Sirius XM NASCAR Radio.

Standings after the race

Drivers' Championship standings

Manufacturers' Championship standings

Note: Only the first 16 positions are included for the driver standings.
. – Driver has clinched a position in the Monster Energy NASCAR Cup Series playoffs.

References

2017 Coke Zero 400
2017 Monster Energy NASCAR Cup Series
2017 in sports in Florida
July 2017 sports events in the United States